Marko Đurić (born 25 June 1983) is a Serbian politician and diplomat serving as the Ambassador of Serbia to the United States of America since 8 October 2020, and the non-resident Ambassador of Serbia to Colombia since 3 July 2021. 

Previously, he served as the Director of the Office for Kosovo and Metohija from 2 September 2013 to 8 October 2020. He has also served as the foreign policy adviser to the President of Serbia from 2012 to 2014. Being a member of the Serbian Progressive Party since its founding in 2008, he currently serves as party's vice president and as member of party's Council for Foreign Policy and European Integration.

Early life and education
Đurić was born in 1983 in Belgrade and is of Jewish descent through his maternal grandmother neurophysiologist Mira Šenberger, married Pašić, a researcher at the Institute Siniša Stanković and a lecturer at the Faculty of Natural Sciences and Mathematics in Belgrade. His grandfather on his mother's side, Dr Najdan Pašić was a professor, social and political theorist, and one of the founders of the University of Belgrade Faculty of Political Sciences. Đurić's great-granduncle is Nikola Pašić who served as Prime Minister of Serbia and Yugoslavia in the first half of the 20th century. Đurić enrolled as a student of a 4-year program of the Faculty of law in 2002, and graduated 8 years later, in 2010. Đurić speaks Serbian and English fluently, he  lived in Israel and speaks Hebrew, and basic French.

Political, academic, and professional activity

Entering politics
He joined Otpor movement in 2000, and became an activist of its press team, taking part in the 5 October Overthrow of the same year, that led to overthrowing of Slobodan Milošević’s regime. Đurić has also hosted and edited a youth political radio talk-show at the nationally broadcast “Radio Belgrade 202” station in 2001 and 2002. From 2002 to 2008, he was a member of the Student parliament at his faculty, where he organised and chaired several public discussions and participated in various student competitions (public speech, moot courts).

Joining the Serbian Progressive Party
In 2008 he wrote an analysis of the proposed new Statute of the Autonomous Province of Vojvodina. That year, he was among the founding members of the Serbian Progressive Party (SNS), and in 2009 he became SNS legal team coordinator and assistant to the Party Deputy President Aleksandar Vučić. Since 2010, he is a Member of the SNS Main Board, also acting as a party spokesman. In 2011 Đurić helped the establishment, and started coordination of SNS Foreign policy and European integration team, took very active and noticeable role during the 2012 election campaign, and in late 2012 he became a member of the Presidency of the Serbian Progressive Party.

In 2011, he was employed as a researcher at the "Institute for political studies" in Belgrade, freezing his status at the Institute after SNS and its candidate Tomislav Nikolić won the general and presidential election in May 2012, and Đurić entered Office of the President.

In June 2012 he was appointed a Foreign Policy Adviser to the President of the Republic of Serbia, with coordination of top officials’ activities regarding the International reaction to the 2008 Kosovo declaration of independence, and the preparation of a Serbian official platform for Belgrade-Pristina negotiations in 2012, along with daily diplomatic communication and strategic policy planning being some of many of his important duties.

Director of the Office for Kosovo and Metohija
On 2 September 2013, he was appointed as the director of Office for Kosovo and Metohija in the Government of Serbia.

Marko Đurić was arrested during the meeting with local Serbs at 26 March 2018 in North Mitrovica by the Special Units of Kosovo Police, after crossing the territory of Kosovo. Kosovo’s deputy prime minister Enver Hoxhaj claimed that Đurić’s presence in Kosovo 'without authorization' of the Kosovar authorities was in breach of EU agreements between the two sides (Brussels Agreement). During the arrest, many journalists were injured by some members of Kosovo Police which was condemned by European Broadcasting Union and OSCE. The act of arrest and violence was condemned by Serbian President Aleksandar Vučić who said that Đurić's trip was legal and in fact according to the Brussels agreement. Đurić was then taken to Pristina, the capital of Kosovo, brought in front of a judge and then escorted from the territory of Kosovo.

Ambassador of Serbia to the United States of America
On 8 October 2020, Đurić was named the new Ambassador of Serbia to the United States of America replacing Đerđ Matković.

On 18 October, Đurić said that 2020 Nagorno-Karabakh conflict is a warning to those who do not believe that Kosovo is still an international powder keg.

References

1983 births
Living people
Politicians from Belgrade
Serbian people of Jewish descent
Members of the National Assembly (Serbia)
Serbian Progressive Party politicians
Diplomats from Belgrade
Ambassadors of Serbia to the United States